Cardfight!! Vanguard G: GIRS Crisis is the second season of Cardfight!! Vanguard G and the sixth season overall in the Cardfight!! Vanguard series. It was broadcast on TV Tokyo from October 11, 2015 to April 10, 2016, airing 26 episodes. It was made available for streaming to Daisuki, Crunchyroll and YouTube.

Plot 
A couple months have passed since the events of G. Chrono is unsure about what he wants to do with his life, while Shion plans on taking over his family’s company and Tokoha seems to have an idea about what she wants to do. With the announcement of the G Quest, Team TRY3 plan on becoming Generation masters. However, they must solve a mystery, which involves the loss of Shion’s family company, and finding how a man named Ryuzu Myojin plans on using the G Quest to awaken the remaining Depend cards. Team TRY3 will have to face new challenges from friends both new and old, while Chrono tries to awaken the three Depend Cards he has. TRY3 must push their Vanguard skills to the next level, not only to reach their future, but also to save both Earth and Planet Cray. Plan G has officially begun, and there’s no going back.

Main Characters 

 Chrono Shindou
 Tokoha Anjou
 Shion Kiba
 Jaime Alcaraz
 Luna Yumizuki
 Am Chouno
 Kouji Ibuki
 Kamui Katsuragi

Antagonists 

 Ryuzu Myoujin
 Ace
 Shouma Shinonome

Theme songs
Opening theme
 "YAIBA" by BREAKERZ - Original Version (eps. 245-270)
 "Break It" by Mamoru Miyano - Dubbed Version (eps. 245-270)

Ending theme
 "Don't Look Back" by Rummy Labyrinth (Aimi Terakawa & Haruka Kudō) (eps. 245-270)

Episode list

References

2015 Japanese television seasons
2016 Japanese television seasons
Cardfight!! Vanguard